The following lists events that happened during 2015 in Uruguay.

Incumbents 
 President: Jose Mujica (until March 1), Tabaré Vázquez (starting March 1)
 Vice President: Danilo Astori (until March 1), Raúl Fernando Sendic (starting March 1)

Events

May
 May 10 – 2015 Uruguayan municipal elections

 
2010s in Uruguay
Uruguay
Uruguay
Years of the 21st century in Uruguay